= Abnody =

Abnody (Russian: Абно́дий) is an old and rare Russian male first name. The patronymics derived from this first name are "Абно́диевич" (Abnodiyevich), "Абно́дьевич" (Abnodyevich; both masculine); and "Абно́диевна" (Abnodiyevna), "Абнодьевна" (Abnodyevna; both feminine).
